Dušica Bijelić is a Serbian soprano.

Bijelić studied piano and singing from the age of 8, and began hosting a children’s programme on Serbian national TV at the age of 12.  She subsequently studied singing at the University of Fine Arts in Belgrade, and continued her studies at the University of Music and Performing Arts, Vienna, the Vienna Conservatory Opera Studio, Bard College Conservatory and the Opera Studio of Santa Cecilia in Rome. She also received full scholarships to attend the Daniel Ferro Vocal Programme in Tuscany for five summers.

Alongside operatic roles at Teatro Real, Madrid, and the Rossini in Wildbad Festival, Bijelić has performed widely in concert and recitals in Europe, the United States and Japan.

Having made her debut at the Royal Opera House, London, in 2012, for the 2013/14 season, Bijelić is singing the role of Barbarina in Mozart's Le nozze di Figaro.

References

Living people
Serbian operatic sopranos
Year of birth missing (living people)
21st-century Serbian women opera singers